Misius is a genus of skippers in the family Hesperiidae. It is monotypic, being represented by the single species Misius misius.

References

Natural History Museum Lepidoptera genus database

Hesperiini
Hesperiidae genera